L'Hôme-Chamondot is a commune in the Orne department in north-western France.

In 1812 the former commune Brotz was merged into L'Hôme-Chamondot.

See also
Communes of the Orne department

References

Homechamondot